List of districts, sections, and neighborhoods in Hudson Waterfront municipalities:
Anderson Ave
Beacon
Bergen Hill
Bergen Square
Bergenline
Bergen-Lafayette
Bergenwood
Bergen Point
Boulevard East
Bull's Ferry
Castle Point
Communipaw
Constable Hook
Croxton
Curries Woods
Droyer's Point
Country Village
Croxton
Edgewater Colony
Exchange Place
Five Corners
Downtown Jersey City
Droyer's Point
Greenville
Hamilton Park
Harsimus
Harmon Cove
India Square
Jersey City Heights
Journal Square
Liberty State Park
Marion Section
McGinley Square
Meadowview
MOTBY
New Durham
Newport
North Hudson
Nungessers
Pamrapo
Paulus Hook
Port Jersey
Port Liberte
Powerhouse
Racetrack
Schuetzen Park
Shadyside
Transfer Station
Undercliff
Union Hill
Van Vorst Park
WALDO
Weehawken Heights
West Side, Jersey City
Western Slope
Woodcliff

Neighborhoods in New Jersey